Parocnus is an extinct genus of sloth native to Cuba and Hispaniola, belonging to the family Megalocnidae. It was a large terrestrial ground sloth, being the second largest Caribbean sloth after Megalocnus.

Taxonomy
After

 †Parocnus browni Pleistocene to Holocene, Cuba 
 †Parocnus serus Pleistocene to Holocene, Hispaniola (synonym Megalocnus zile)
†Parocnus dominicanus Pleistocene to Holocene, Hispaniola

References

Prehistoric sloths
Mammals of the Caribbean
Prehistoric placental genera
Fossil taxa described in 1929